Alan Lamb is an Australian artist, composer, and sound sculptor.

Biography
During the early 1970s Lamb studied for a PhD in neurophysiology at the University of Edinburgh.

References

External links
Bibliography and list of installations on the Australian Sound Design Project website
Biography and description of instruments
W I R E D Lab Project

Year of birth missing (living people)
Living people
Australian artists